Events from the year 1522 in art.

Works
 Antonio da Correggio completes the frescoes of the Vision of St. John on Patmos in the church of San Giovanni Evangelista (Parma).
 Benedikt Dreyer completes a Gothic altar called the "Antonius altar" for the Burg church in Lübeck.
 Titian completes the Averoldi Polyptych for the Santi Nazaro e Celso (Brescia).
 Bernard van Orley completes a triptych for the Brotherhood of the Holy Cross in a chapel of the Saint Walburga church in Veurne.

Painting

 Hans Baldung – The Stoning of Saint Stephen
 Hans Holbein – The Body of the Dead Christ in the Tomb
 Ludovico Mazzolino
 Christ and the Woman Taken in Adultery
 Madonna and Child with St. Joseph
 Ortolano Ferrarese – Mourning the Dead Christ (Galleria Borghese, Rome)
 Lucas van Leyden – Virgin and Child with the Magdalene and a Donor

Births
 Antonio Campi, Italian painter (died 1587)
 Bernardino Campi, Italian Renaissance painter (died 1591)
 Dirck Volckertszoon Coornhert, Dutch writer, engraver, philosopher, translator, politician and theologian (died 1590)
 Federico Brandani, Italian sculptor and stuccoist who worked in an urbane Mannerist style as a court artist (died 1575)
 Jean Cousin the Younger, French painter, sculptor (died 1595)
 Pietro Marescalchi, Italian Renaissance painter (died 1589)
 Ludger Tom Ring the Younger, German painter and draughtsman (died 1584)

Deaths
 Giovanni Antonio Amadeo, Italian early Renaissance sculptor, architect and engineer (born c. 1447)
 Paolo Moranda Cavazzola, Italian painter active mainly in his hometown of Verona (born 1486)
 Piero di Cosimo, Florentine painter (born 1462)
 Fiorenzo di Lorenzo, Italian painter of the Umbrian school (born 1440)
 (died 1522-1532): Colijn de Coter, early Netherlandish painter who produced mainly altarpieces (born 1440/1445)

References

 
Years of the 16th century in art